Gerilja is an alternative rock band from Oslo, Norway. Their songs are about what they were told in the 1980s to expect of the future, so there is constant allusion to retro sci-fi.  Their music uses analogue synthesisers instead of the current trend for all-digital studio production. Their stated musical influences are Megadeth, T-rex and 80's hip hop.

Their image follows the same retro-cool style of their music; bringing together all of the coolest elements of the 80's with the band's modern spin on it.

History
Gerilja supported Mindless Self Indulgence on a European tour in 2008 and were part of a 20-date western European tour with Kvelertak and Årabrot in 2013.

Awards
 NRK's Zoom/Urørt 2008

Discography

Albums
 Step Up Your Game (2013)

Singles
 Animals (2013)

EPs
 Pink Slush Twilight (2009)

Demos
 Disco Shakedown (2008)

Film Clips
 Disco Shakedown (2008)
 Lightning Death (2012)
 Animals (2013)

References

External links
 Gerilja website
 Gerilja Facebook Page
 Gerilja on MusicBrainz

Musical groups established in 2007
Norwegian psychedelic rock music groups